Richhill Amalgamated Football Club is an intermediate level football club playing in the Intermediate A division of the Mid-Ulster Football League in Northern Ireland. The club was founded in 2016 following the amalgamation of Richhill F.C. and Broomhill F.C. The club is based in Richhill, County Armagh and competes in the Irish Cup where it progressed to the Fifth Round in their first season in the competition.

In addition to the successful Irish Cup run, Richhill AFC enjoyed a memorable debut season by winning the Mid-Ulster Intermediate B league title and the Alan Wilson Cup.

External links
 Daily Mirror Mid-Ulster Football League Official website
 nifootball.co.uk - (For fixtures, results and tables of all Northern Ireland amateur football leagues)

Notes

Association football clubs in Northern Ireland
Association football clubs established in 2016
Association football clubs in County Armagh
Mid-Ulster Football League clubs
2016 establishments in Northern Ireland